Hans Fredrik Grøvan (born 1 November 1953) is a Norwegian politician for the Christian Democratic Party. He served as the party’s parliamentary leader from 2019 to 2021.

Career

Parliament
He was elected to the Norwegian Parliament from Vest-Agder in 2013.
He served as a deputy representative to the Norwegian Parliament from Vest-Agder during the term 2001–2005. 

On 29 January 2019, Grøvan was appointed the party’s parliamentary leader after Knut Arild Hareide resigned from the position.

Grøvan ran for re-election for the 2021 election, but lost the nomination to Jorunn Gleditsch Lossius in November 2020. The party went on to lose five seats in Parliament in the election on 13 September 2021.

Local politics
On the local level he was the mayor of Lyngdal from 1995 to 2007. He was chairman of the board of Agder Energi to 2005.

References

External links

1953 births
Living people
Deputy members of the Storting
Christian Democratic Party (Norway) politicians
Mayors of places in Vest-Agder
21st-century Norwegian politicians